This was the first edition of the tournament.

Roman Jebavý and Jiří Veselý won the title after defeating Lee Hsin-han and Zhang Ze 6–1, 6–3 in the final.

Seeds

Draw

Draw

References
 Main Draw

Prague Open - Doubles
2014 - Doubles